Menozziola is a genus of flies in the family Phoridae.

Species
M. camponoti Schmitz, 1934
M. diversipes Borgmeier, 1961
M. fraterna (Beyer, 1965)
M. glandularis Borgmeier, 1961
M. incisipennis (Borgmeier & Prado, 1975)
M. obscuripes (Schmitz, 1927
M. recurvata (Borgmeier & Prado, 1975)
M. schmitzi (Menozzi, 1921)
M. serialis Schmitz, 1938
M. sororia (Beyer, 1965)

References

Phoridae
Platypezoidea genera